The Channel League is a high school athletic conference in California affiliated with the CIF Southern Section. As of the 2018–19 school year, all member schools are located in Santa Barbara County, California.

Schools
Dos Pueblos High School, Goleta
San Marcos High School, Santa Barbara
Santa Barbara High School

Former members
Buena High School, Ventura (through 2018; joined Pacific View League)
Cabrillo High School, Lompoc (through 2022; joined Central Coast Athletic Association)
Hueneme High School, Oxnard (through 1998; joined Pacific View League)
Lompoc High School (through 2022; joined Central Coast Athletic Association)
Oxnard High School (through 1998; joined Pacific View League)
Rio Mesa High School, Oxnard (through 1998; joined Pacific View League)
Santa Ynez Valley Union High School, Santa Ynez (through 2022; joined Central Coast Athletic Association)
St. Bonaventure High School, Ventura (2002–2009, football only; joined Marmonte League in 2010)
Ventura High School (through 2018; joined Pacific View League)

Football association with Pacific View League
In April 2019, during the biennial releaguing process in the Northern Area of the CIF Southern Section, administrators from member schools approved a proposal to create an association with the Pacific View League in the sport of football only. The association, composed of the 12 schools from the two leagues combined, assigns each school to one of the leagues, with promotion and relegation taking place every two years. The plan was originally scheduled to begin in the 2020–21 school year. However, the COVID-19 pandemic has delayed its implementation, as the 2020 football season was postponed and shortened; upon the return of sports in early 2021, health officials in Ventura County prohibited schools there from playing teams in adjacent counties (this restriction was later lifted). In May 2021, another round of realignment saw the merging of the Channel League with the Pacific View League, beginning with the 2022–23 academic year.

Sports
The Channel League sponsors the following sports:

Fall season
Football (11-man)
Cross country
Boys' water polo
Girls' golf
Girls' tennis
Girls' volleyball

Winter season
Basketball
Soccer
Wrestling
Girls' water polo

Spring season
Baseball
Boys' golf
Lacrosse, Boys & Girls
Softball
Swimming
Track and field
Boys' tennis
Boys' volleyball

References

CIF Southern Section leagues
Sports in Santa Barbara County, California